The Community Center and War Memorial Building is a building located in Everett, Washington listed on the National Register of Historic Places. Built by the Knights of Columbus in 1921, it was designed by Tacoma architects Charles Lundberg and C. Frank Mahon.

See also
 National Register of Historic Places listings in Snohomish County, Washington

References

Clubhouses on the National Register of Historic Places in Washington (state)
Masonic buildings in Washington (state)
National Register of Historic Places in Everett, Washington
Buildings and structures completed in 1921